Darren John Harmon (born 30 January 1973) is an English former professional footballer who played as a midfielder.

Early and personal life
Born in Northampton, his son Dan was also a footballer, who, like his father, also played for Northampton Town and Kettering Town.

Career
Harmon began his career with Cogenhoe United. He then played professionally for Notts County, Shrewsbury Town and Northampton Town, making 95 appearances in the Football League. He next played for and Kettering Town, but left them because he was "fed up" with travelling to away games; he worked as a computer salesman whilst playing for local teams including Buckingham Town and Ford Sports. By 2001 he was playing for Readflex Rangers. In 2002–03 he was playing for Newport Pagnell Town. By October 2003 he was back at Buckingham Town.

References

1973 births
Living people
English footballers
Cogenhoe United F.C. players
Notts County F.C. players
Shrewsbury Town F.C. players
Northampton Town F.C. players
Kettering Town F.C. players
Buckingham Town F.C. players
Daventry United F.C. players
Newport Pagnell Town F.C. players
English Football League players
Association football midfielders